St Clair County School District is a school district in St. Clair County, Alabama consisting of 20 schools, including four high schools, twelve elementary and middle schools, a PreK–12 school, and three special schools.

School board
 Mike Howard – Superintendent
 Nickie Stevens VanPelt – District 1 (At Large)
 Mike Hobbs – District 2 (Springville)
 Marie Manning	– District 3 (Ragland)
 Bill Morris – District 4 (At Large)
 Scott Suttle – District 5 (Moody)
 Allison Gray – District 6 (Odenville)
 Randy Thompson – District 7 (Ashville)

Schools

External links
 

Education in St. Clair County, Alabama